Matthew Thomas Schelp (born 1970) is a United States district judge of the United States District Court for the Eastern District of Missouri.

Education 

Schelp earned his Bachelor of Science in Business Administration and Juris Doctor from the University of Missouri.

Career 

Upon graduation from law school, Schelp served in the United States Navy's Judge Advocate General's Corps. Schelp served for nearly a decade as an Assistant United States Attorney for the Eastern District of Missouri and co-founded a boutique litigation firm in St. Louis with Jeffrey Jensen. Prior to becoming a judge, he was a partner at Husch Blackwell in St. Louis, Missouri, where his practice focused on government compliance, investigations, and litigation.

Military service 

From 1996 to 1999 Schelp  was an active member in the Judge Advocate General's Corps of the U.S. Navy. From 2002 to 2012 he was a Naval Reserve Judge Advocate General.

Federal judicial service 

On November 6, 2019, President Donald Trump announced his intent to nominate Schelp to serve as a United States district judge for the United States District Court for the Eastern District of Missouri. On December 2, 2019, his nomination was sent to the Senate. Trump nominated Schelp to the seat to be vacated by Judge Stephen N. Limbaugh Jr., who would assume senior status on August 1, 2020. A hearing on his nomination before the Senate Judiciary Committee was held on December 4, 2019. On January 3, 2020, his nomination was returned to the president under Rule XXXI, Paragraph 6 of the United States Senate. Later that day, he was re-nominated to the same seat. On January 16, 2020, his nomination was reported out of committee by a 16–6 vote. On February 11, 2020, the Senate invoked cloture on his nomination by a 72–22 vote. On February 12, 2020, his nomination was confirmed by a 72–23 vote. He received his judicial commission on August 4, 2020.

On November 29, 2021 he ruled against a federal vaccination mandate for health care workers in ten states. The opinion was called "misleading" and "highly disingenuous" as it falsely indicated the vaccine did not reduce transmission. The cited filing by the Centers for Medicare & Medicaid Services could not quantify its rule's impact due to uncertainty about the extent of transmission among vaccinated individuals but did state with evidence that it certainly decreased transmission risk.

Memberships 

He has been a member of the Federalist Society since 2015.

References

External links 
 

1970 births
Living people
20th-century American lawyers
21st-century American lawyers
21st-century American judges
Assistant United States Attorneys
Federalist Society members
United States Navy Judge Advocate General's Corps
Judges of the United States District Court for the Eastern District of Missouri
Kansas lawyers
Lawyers from Kansas City, Missouri
Lawyers from St. Louis
Missouri lawyers
Texas lawyers
United States district court judges appointed by Donald Trump
United States Navy officers
United States Navy reservists
University of Missouri School of Law alumni